Saint-Maurice-de-Beynost (literally Saint-Maurice of Beynost) is a commune in the Ain department, in the Auvergne-Rhône-Alpes region, located at about  from Lyon.

The commune is included in the canton of Miribel and in the intercommunality of communauté de communes de Miribel et du Plateau.

A small farming village at the beginning of the 20th century, the commune of Saint-Maurice-de-Beynost became an industrial town in the 1920s, following the construction of the second textile factory of the "Lyon Society of Artificial Silk". The need for workers in this factory led to a quadrupling of the population in just five years, between 1926 and 1931. Today, the factory, which belongs to the Japanese group Toray Industries, is still the main employer in the city with nearly five hundred employees.

The inhabitants of Saint-Maurice-de-Beynost are called Mauriciens.

Population

Sports 
 Ain Sud Foot, football

See also
Communes of the Ain department
Canton of Miribel

References

 
Communes of Ain
Armenian diaspora communities
Ain communes articles needing translation from French Wikipedia